Asulam is a herbicide invented by  May & Baker Ltd , internally called M&B9057, that is used in horticulture and agriculture to kill bracken and docks. It is also used as an antiviral agent. It is currently marketed, by United Phosphorus Ltd - UPL, as "Asulox" which contains 400 g/L of asulam sodium salt.

Asulam was declared not approved by the Commission Implementing Regulation (EU) No 1045/2011 of 19 October 2011 concerning the non-approval of the active substance asulam. Concerns included: lack of evidence concerning the fate of the toxic metabolite sulfanilamide and other metabolites; the poorly characterised nature of the impurities potentially present in the technical-grade product; toxicity to birds. This decision is given in with Regulation (EC) No 1107/2009 of the European Parliament and of the Council concerning the placing of plant protection products on the market, and amending Commission Decision 2008/934/EC (http://eur-lex.europa.eu/LexUriServ/LexUriServ.do?uri=OJ:L:2011:275:0023:0024:EN:PDF).

References

Further reading
 

Herbicides
Carbamates
Sulfonamides
Anilines